This is a list of members of the Tasmanian House of Assembly, elected at the 2010 state election.

 Labor MHA for Denison and former Premier of Tasmania, David Bartlett, resigned on 16 May 2011. Graeme Sturges was elected as his replacement on 26 May 2011.

Distribution of seats

See also
List of past members of the Tasmanian House of Assembly

Members of Tasmanian parliaments by term
21st-century Australian politicians